Celia is a Spanish-language telenovela produced by Fox Telecolombia for RCN Televisión and Telemundo which is based on the life of Cuban singer Celia Cruz. The telenovela's theme "La Negra Tiene Tumbao" received an award for Television Theme Song of the Year, at the 2016 American Society of Composers, Authors and Publishers Awards.

Plot
Celia tells the story of one of the legends of Latin music and her major international career: Celia Cruz. We know the beginnings of her passion for singing in Cuba starting in 1950, and her recognition as the most decisive singer of La Sonora Matancera. Leaving Cuba with her future husband Pedro Knight, a trumpeter with La Sonora Matancera, the series follows her departure from Cuba to Mexico soon after the Castro revolution took control of the island in 1959. The series then showcases her subsequent move to New York City, and follows her early days there, and then how her career conquered markets in other languages as she became one of the most recognized Salsa singers of all time. She honored the musical genre with her signature phrase "Azucar"  (Sugar). The series showcases her love and longing for her Cuban country, always hoping that a positive change would come during her lifetime. Celia Cruz has become an invaluable legacy in the world in which she was renowned internationally as the "Queen of Salsa", "La Guarachera de Cuba", as well as "The Queen of Latin Music."

Cast

Main 

 Jeimy Osorio as Young Celia Cruz
 Aymée Nuviola as Celia Cruz
 Modesto Lacén as Young Pedro Knight
 Willy Denton as Pedro Knight
 Carolina Gaitán as Young Lola Calvo
 Abel Rodríguez as Eliécer Calvo
 Margoth Velásquez as Ollita Alfonso
 Aida Bossa as Young Noris Alfonso
 Luciano D'Alessandro as Young Alberto Blanco
Jonathan Islas as Young Mario Agüero
 Brenda Hanst as Ana Alfonso
 José Narváez as René Neira
 Alberto Pujol as Rogelio Martínez
 Indhira Serrano as Myrelys Bocanegra
 Jorge Cárdenas as Caíto
 Michel Guillo as Gamaliel "Gamita" Alfonso
 Moisés Angulo as Simón Cruz
 Marcela Gallego as Lola Calvo
 Ivette Zamora as Noris Alfonso
 José Rojas as Alberto Blanco
 Mauricio Mauad as Mario Agüero

Recurring 
 Carolina Sabino as Myrta Silva
 Diana Wiswell as Young Raquel Moreno
 Claudia De Hoyos as Raquel Moreno
 Carlos Vesga as Billy Echaverría
 Juan Alfonso Baptista as Ramón Cabrera
 Félix Antequera as Commander Fidel
 Luis Gerado Lopez as Commander Lilo Candela
 Mauricio Mejía as Commander Juan
 Mijail Mulkay as Tito Puente
 Bárbaro Marín as Rolando Laserie
 Laura Peñuela as Rita Laserie
 Andrés Echavarria as Larry Harlow
 Jean Phillipe Laurent as Jerry Masucci
 Luis Eduardo Arango as Johnny Pacheco
 Victor Gómez as Willie Colon
 Andy Caicedo as Oscarito
 Ariel Díaz as Prado
 Adrián Makalá as Ralphi

Note(s)

Broadcast and audience
The series originally aired from 5 October 2015 to 5 February 2016 in Colombia on RCN Televisión. The series aired on Telemundo from 13 October 2015 until 8 February 2016.

In Colombia, the series premiered with 13.3 of rating, exceeding the program La Voz Kids Colombia. His final chapter by Caracol Televisión only got a total of 8.3 rating. In the United States the series debuted with 2.38 million viewers.

Awards and nominations

References

External links 
 
 Celia official website on Telemundo
 Celia official website on RCN Televisión

Spanish-language telenovelas
Colombian telenovelas
Telemundo telenovelas
Spanish-language American telenovelas
RCN Televisión telenovelas
2015 Colombian television series debuts
2015 American television series debuts
2015 telenovelas
2016 Colombian television series endings
2016 American television series endings
Television series based on singers and musicians
Television shows set in Bogotá
Television shows set in Cartagena, Colombia